T'uru (Quechua for mud, also spelled Toro) is a mountain in the Cordillera Central in the Andes of Peru which reaches an altitude of approximately . It is situated in the Lima Region, Yauyos Province, in the districts of Colonia and Huantan. T'uru lies southeast of Upyanqa and Wankarqucha east of the lake named Wankarqucha. There is a little lake southeast of the mountain which is named Chullumpiqucha ("lake of the white-tufted grebe", Hispanicized spelling Chullumpicocha).

References

Mountains of Peru
Mountains of Lima Region